Phliantidae is a family of isopod-like amphipod crustaceans chiefly from the southern hemisphere.

Description
Members of the family Phliantidae are unusual among the order Amphipoda, because they have dorso-ventrally flattened bodies with a pronounced dorsal keel, rather than being flattened side-to-side. Because of this, and various other factors, including the square-ended form of the rostrum, they resemble isopods.

Distribution and ecology
Most species are found in the Southern Hemisphere, where they live on algae in the intertidal zone.

Taxonomy

Phliantidae was originally proposed by Thomas Roscoe Rede Stebbing in 1899 for a group that also contained the genera currently placed in the family Prophliantidae, while Temnophlias has also been moved from Phliantidae to its own monotypic families. It contains the following genera:
Iphinotus Stebbing, 1899
Palinnotus Stebbing, 1900
Pariphinotus Kunkel, 1910
Pereionotus Bate & Westwood, 1862
Plioplateia Barnard, 1916

References

Gammaridea
Taxa named by Thomas Roscoe Rede Stebbing
Crustacean families